Gristhorpe is a village and civil parish in the Scarborough 
district of North Yorkshire, England. According to the 2011 UK census, Gristhorpe parish had a population of 397, an increase on the 2001 UK census figure of 386.

The remains of Gristhorpe Man, now on display in the Rotunda Museum, Scarborough, were found buried in a tree trunk in Gristhorpe in the 19th century.

Gristhorpe railway station on the Yorkshire Coast Line from Hull to Scarborough served the village until it closed on 16 February 1959.

The village main street features a small privately owned church, constructed of corrugated steel sheeting and a village public house, named "The Bull Inn".

The entrance to the village was previously dominated by Dale Power Solutions generator manufacturing plant. Established in 1935 by Leonard Dale, it provided standby power services and products for a wide range of applications. The plant was demolished in late 2019 and in early 2020 a new housing development was begun.  (This is still in the early construction stage, May 2020)

References

External links

Villages in North Yorkshire
Civil parishes in North Yorkshire